Bushley is a rural locality in the Rockhampton Region, Queensland, Australia.

Geography 
Bushley railway station is an abandoned railway station on  Central Western railway line.

History 
The locality presumably takes its name from the Bushley railway station.

Playfair State School opened on 10 July 1917. It closed on 1928. It presumably takes its name from the parish. The school was located at approximately 213 Sandy Creek Road.

In 2019, Bushley was selected as the site of a new waste transfer station which aimed to serve the needs of residents of Rockhampton Regional Council's western districts from Gogango to Stanwell following the closure of roadside bin stations. The council's decision to close the local roadside bin stations had previously been criticised by residents and led to a heated community meeting at nearby Wycarbah in 2018.

Amenities 
Bushley Uniting Church is at 525 Brickworks Road (access from Bushley Road off the Capricorn Highway). It was part of the Parish of Rockhampton South Uniting Church.

The existing brick church was officially opened on 13 December 1959. The final service was held at the church on 5 December 2021, just shy of its 62nd anniversary, which was attended by about 75 people including Uniting Church moderator Rev Andrew Gunton. The church was closed due to dwindling attendance numbers.

Church services at Bushley date back to 1875 when worship was held at the home of the Coombs family.  The Coombs family later donated their land for the construction of a community hall where church services were held until the opening of the existing brick church building in 1959.

References 

Suburbs of Rockhampton Region
Localities in Queensland